Yuvraj Chudasama (born 23 November 1995) is an Indian cricketer. He made his Twenty20 debut for Saurashtra in the 2017–18 Zonal T20 League on 8 January 2018. He made his List A debut for Saurashtra in the 2018–19 Vijay Hazare Trophy on 23 September 2018. He made his first-class debut for Saurashtra in the 2018–19 Ranji Trophy on 28 November 2018.

References

External links
 

1995 births
Living people
Indian cricketers
Saurashtra cricketers
Place of birth missing (living people)